Jessie G. Beach ( – ) was an American paleontologist and museum aide. She worked for the Smithsonian Institution's department of paleobiology at the United States National Museum (now the National Museum of Natural History). Beach is one of the notable "Smithsonian women in science", working at a time when very few women had these roles.

Biography 
Jessie G. Beach was born on October 5,  in Stephenville, Erath County, Texas, to parents Luella (née Wood) and Benjamin F. Beach. She was a Baptist. Beach attended Baylor University, and George Washington University. She received a B.S. and M.S. degree from George Washington University, where her graduate studies was focused on archaeology.

From 1918 until 1920, Beach worked at the Smithsonian Institution as a typist, followed by a promotion to a museum aide which she remained at until her death in 1954. In 1922, Beach traveled to France, Italy, Germany, Belgium, England, and Scotland in order to consult museums on their best cataloguing practices. In 1945, Beach aided the head curator in preparing exhibitions which often meant proper labeling, describing scientific terms, cleaning, and rearranging displays. She served as an aid to several departments and for several people including Charles E. Resser, Ray S. Bassler, and William F. Foshag. Her work at the museum influenced the publishing of "Bryozoa of the Philippine Region" (1929), authored by Ferdinand Canu and Ray S. Bassler.

Jessie G. Beach died in the hospital on August 16, 1954 in Fort Worth, Texas, after struggling with her health since April of the same year. She was cremated in Dallas, and has a gravestone at the Beach Cemetery in Johnsville, Texas.

Publications 
Between 1929 to 1931, Beach wrote articles for the Evening Star newspaper in Washington, D.C. about new museum developments.

References 

1887 births
1954 deaths
George Washington University alumni
American paleontologists
Smithsonian Institution people
20th-century American women scientists
Museum administrators
People from Stephenville, Texas
People from Washington, D.C.
Women paleontologists